Onchocerciasis, also known as river blindness, is a disease caused by infection with the parasitic worm Onchocerca volvulus. Symptoms include severe itching, bumps under the skin, and blindness. It is the second-most common cause of blindness due to infection, after trachoma.

The parasite worm is spread by the bites of a black fly of the Simulium type. Usually, many bites are required before infection occurs. These flies live near rivers, hence the common name of the disease. Once inside a person, the worms create larvae that make their way out to the skin, where they can infect the next black fly that bites the person. There are a number of ways to make the diagnosis, including: placing a biopsy of the skin in normal saline and watching for the larva to come out; looking in the eye for larvae; and looking within the bumps under the skin for adult worms.

A vaccine against the disease does not exist. Prevention is by avoiding being bitten by flies. This may include the use of insect repellent and proper clothing. Other efforts include those to decrease the fly population by spraying insecticides. Efforts to eradicate the disease by treating entire groups of people twice a year are ongoing in a number of areas of the world. Treatment of those infected is with the medication ivermectin every six to twelve months. This treatment kills the larvae but not the adult worms. The antibiotic doxycycline weakens the worms by killing an associated bacterium called Wolbachia, and is recommended by some as well. The lumps under the skin may also be removed by surgery.

About 15.5 million people are infected with river blindness. Approximately 0.8 million have some amount of loss of vision from the infection. Most infections occur in sub-Saharan Africa, although cases have also been reported in Yemen and isolated areas of Central and South America. In 1915, the physician Rodolfo Robles first linked the worm to eye disease. It is listed by the World Health Organization (WHO) as a neglected tropical disease. In 2013 Colombia became the first country to eradicate the disease.

Signs and symptoms
Adult worms remain in subcutaneous nodules, limiting access to the host's immune system. Microfilariae, in contrast, are able to induce intense inflammatory responses, especially upon their death. Wolbachia species have been found to be endosymbionts of O. volvulus adults and microfilariae, and are thought to be the driving force behind most of O. volvulus morbidity. Dying microfilariae have been recently discovered to release Wolbachia surface protein that activates TLR2 and TLR4, triggering innate immune responses and producing the inflammation and its associated morbidity.  The severity of illness is directly proportional to the number of infected microfilariae and the power of the resultant inflammatory response.

Skin involvement typically consists of intense itching, swelling, and inflammation. A grading system has been developed to categorize the degree of skin involvement:
 Acute papular onchodermatitis – scattered pruritic papules
 Chronic papular onchodermatitis – larger papules, resulting in hyperpigmentation
 Lichenified onchodermatitis – hyperpigmented papules and plaques, with edema, lymphadenopathy, pruritus and common secondary bacterial infections
 Skin atrophy – loss of elasticity, the skin resembles tissue paper, 'lizard skin' appearance
 Depigmentation – 'leopard skin' appearance, usually on anterior lower leg
 Glaucoma effect – eyes malfunction, begin to see shadows or nothing

Ocular involvement provides the common name associated with onchocerciasis, river blindness, and may involve any part of the eye from conjunctiva and cornea to uvea and posterior segment, including the retina and optic nerve. The microfilariae migrate to the surface of the cornea. Punctate keratitis occurs in the infected area. This clears up as the inflammation subsides. However, if the infection is chronic, sclerosing keratitis can occur, making the affected area become opaque. Over time, the entire cornea may become opaque, thus leading to blindness. Some evidence suggests the effect on the cornea is caused by an immune response to bacteria present in the worms.

The infected person's skin is itchy, with severe rashes permanently damaging patches of skin.

Mazzotti reaction

The Mazzotti reaction, first described in 1948, is a symptom complex seen in patients after undergoing treatment of onchocerciasis with the medication diethylcarbamazine (DEC). Mazzotti reactions can be life-threatening, and are characterized by fever, urticaria, swollen and tender lymph nodes, tachycardia, hypotension, arthralgias, oedema, and abdominal pain that occur within seven days of treatment of microfilariasis.

The phenomenon is so common when DEC is used that this drug is the basis of a skin patch test used to confirm that diagnosis. The drug patch is placed on the skin, and if the patient is infected with O. volvulus microfilaria, localized pruritus and urticaria are seen at the application site.

Nodding disease

This is an unusual form of epidemic epilepsy associated with onchocerciasis although definitive link has not been established. This syndrome was first described in Tanzania by Louise Jilek-Aall, a Norwegian psychiatric doctor in Tanzanian practice, during the 1960s. It occurs most commonly in Uganda and South Sudan. It manifests itself in previously healthy 5–15-year-old children, is often triggered by eating or low temperatures and is accompanied by cognitive impairment. Seizures occur frequently and may be difficult to control. The electroencephalogram is abnormal but cerebrospinal fluid (CSF) and magnetic resonance imaging (MRI) are normal or show non-specific changes. If there are abnormalities on the MRI they are usually present in the hippocampus. Polymerase chain reaction testing of the CSF does not show the presence of the parasite.

Cause
The cause is Onchocerca volvulus.

Life cycle
The life of the parasite can be traced through the black fly and the human hosts in the following steps:

 A Simulium female black fly takes a blood meal on an infected human host, and ingests microfilaria.
 The microfilaria enter the gut and thoracic flight muscles of the black fly, progressing into the first larval stage (J1.).
 The larvae mature into the second larval stage (J2.), and move to the proboscis and into the saliva in its third larval stage (J3.). Maturation takes about seven days.
 The black fly takes another blood meal, passing the larvae into the next human host's blood.
 The larvae migrate to the subcutaneous tissue and undergo two more molts.  They form nodules as they mature into adult worms over six to 12 months.
 After maturing, adult male worms mate with female worms in the subcutaneous tissue to produce between 700 and 1,500 microfilaria per day.
 The microfilaria migrate to the skin during the day, and the black flies only feed in the day, so the parasite is in a prime position for the female fly to ingest it. Black flies take blood meals to ingest these microfilaria to restart the cycle.

Diagnosis

Diagnosis can be made by skin biopsy (with or without PCR) or antibody testing. A skin biopsy removes approximately 2 mg of skin tissue by sclerocorneal biospy punch or shaving a cone of skin with a scalpel. The skin tissue sample is analyzed for the parasite larvae using a microscope. Nodulectomy can be used to analyze skin nodules for the presence of parasites. Slit lamp eye exams are used to identify signs of the parasites in and around the eyes of patients whose eyes are affected. Antibody tests when available can aid in the diagnosis of Onchocerciasis.

Classification
Onchocerciasis causes different kinds of skin changes, which vary in different geographic regions; it may be divided into the following phases or types:

Erisipela de la costa
An acute phase, it is characterized by swelling of the face, with erythema and itching. This skin change, erisípela de la costa, of acute onchocerciasis is most commonly seen among victims in Central and South America.

Mal morando
This cutaneous condition is characterized by inflammation accompanied by hyperpigmentation.
Sowda
A cutaneous condition, it is a localized type of onchocerciasis.

Additionally, the various skin changes associated with onchocerciasis may be described as follows:

Leopard skin
The spotted depigmentation of the skin that may occur with onchocerciasis
Elephant skin
The thickening of human skin that may be associated with onchocerciasis
Lizard skin
The thickened, wrinkled skin changes that may result with onchocerciasis

Prevention
Various control programs aim to stop onchocerciasis from being a public health problem. The first was the Onchocerciasis Control Programme (OCP), which was launched in 1974, and at its peak, covered 30 million people in 11 countries. Through the use of larvicide spraying of fast-flowing rivers to control black fly populations, and from 1988 onwards, the use of ivermectin to treat infected people, the OCP eliminated onchocerciasis as a public health problem. The OCP, a joint effort of the World Health Organization, the World Bank, the United Nations Development Programme, and the UN Food and Agriculture Organization, was considered to be a success, and came to an end in 2002. Continued monitoring ensures onchocerciasis cannot reinvade the area of the OCP. Effective prevention efforts include personal protection from black fly bites. Recommended protection measures include using insect repellents and wearing long sleeves and pants to eliminate exposed skin. Using insect repellent that contains N,N-Diethyl-meta-toluamide (DEET) as well as clothing treated with permethrin, an insecticide, can provide additional protection from black fly bites.

Elimination 
In 1995, the African Programme for Onchocerciasis Control (APOC) began covering another 19 countries, mainly relying upon the use of the drug ivermectin. Its goal was to set up community-directed treatment with ivermectin for those at risk of infection. In these ways, transmission has declined. APOC closed in 2015 and aspects of its work taken over by the WHO Expanded Special Programme for the Elimination of Neglected Tropical Diseases (ESPEN). As in the Americas, the objective of ESPEN working with Government Health Ministries and partner NGDOs, is the elimination of transmission of onchocerciasis. This requires consistent annual treatment of 80% of the population in endemic areas for at least 10–12 years – the life span of the adult worm. No African country has so far verified elimination of onchocerciasis, but treatment has stopped in some areas (e.g. Nigeria), following epidemiological and entomological assessments that indicated that no ongoing transmission could be detected. In 2015, WHO facilitated the launch of an elimination program in Yemen which was subsequently put on hold due to conflict.

In 1992, the Onchocerciasis Elimination Programme for the Americas, which also relies on ivermectin, was launched. On July 29, 2013, the Pan American Health Organization (PAHO) announced that after 16 years of efforts, Colombia had become the first country in the world to eliminate onchocerciasis. In September 2015, the Onchocerciasis Elimination Program for the Americas announced that onchocerciasis only remained in a remote region on the border of Brazil and Venezuela.  The area is home to the Yanomami indigenous people. The first countries to receive verification of elimination were Colombia in 2013, Ecuador in 2014, Mexico in 2015 and Guatemala in 2016. The key factor in elimination is mass administration of the antiparasitic drug ivermectin. The initial projection was that the disease would be eliminated from remaining foci in the Americas by 2012.

No vaccine to prevent onchocerciasis infection in humans is available. A vaccine to prevent onchocerciasis infection for cattle is in phase three trials. Cattle injected with a modified and weakened form of O. ochengi larvae have developed very high levels of protection against infection.  The findings suggest that it could be possible to develop a vaccine that protects people against river blindness using a similar approach.  Unfortunately, a vaccine to protect humans is still many years off.

Treatment

In mass drug administration (MDA) programmes, the treatment for onchocerciasis is ivermectin (trade name: Mectizan); infected people can be treated with two doses of ivermectin, six months apart, repeated every three years. The drug paralyses and kills the microfilariae causing fever, itching, and possibly oedema, arthritis and lymphadenopathy. Intense skin itching is eventually relieved, and the progression towards blindness is halted. In addition, while the drug does not kill the adult worms, it does prevent them for a limited time from producing additional offspring. However the drug does not prevent transmission of Onchocerciasis. It however reduces morbidity and has shown promising results to elliminate in some endemic areas of Africa

Ivermectin treatment is particularly effective because it only needs to be taken once or twice a year, needs no refrigeration, and has a wide margin of safety, with the result that it has been widely given by minimally trained community health workers.

Antibiotics
For the treatment of individuals, doxycycline is used to kill the Wolbachia bacteria that live in adult worms. This adjunct therapy has been shown to significantly lower microfilarial loads in the host, and may kill the adult worms, due to the symbiotic relationship between Wolbachia and the worm. In four separate trials over ten years with various dosing regimens of doxycycline for individualized treatment, doxycycline was found to be effective in sterilizing the female worms and reducing their numbers over a period of four to six weeks. Research on other antibiotics, such as rifampicin, has shown it to be effective in animal models at reducing Wolbachia both as an alternative and as an adjunct to doxycycline. However, doxycycline treatment requires daily dosing for at least four to six weeks, making it more difficult to administer in the affected areas.

Ivermectin
Ivermectin kills the parasite by interfering with the nervous system and muscle function, in particular, by enhancing inhibitory neurotransmission. The drug binds to and activates glutamate-gated chloride channels. These channels, present in neurons and myocytes, are not invertebrate-specific, but are protected in vertebrates from the action of ivermectin by the blood–brain barrier. Ivermectin is thought to irreversibly activate these channel receptors in the worm, eventually causing an inhibitory postsynaptic potential. The chance of a future action potential occurring in synapses between neurons decreases and the nematodes experience flaccid paralysis followed by death.

Ivermectin is directly effective against the larval stage microfilariae of O. volvulus; they are paralyzed and can be killed by eosinophils and macrophages. It does not kill adult females (macrofilariae), but does cause them to cease releasing microfilariae, perhaps by paralyzing the reproductive tract. Ivermectin is very effective in reducing microfilarial load and reducing number of punctate opacities in individuals with onchocerciasis.

Moxidectin
After two decades of research, moxidectin was approved by the U.S. Food and Drug Administration in 2018 for use in ages 12 and older. Ongoing studies are looking to identify doses that will be safe for children ages 4–11. The oral dosage for moxidectin in adults and children 12 and up is 8 mg in a single dose. Moxidectin has been found to more strongly suppress the O. volvulus microfilariae for longer than ivermectin treatments, with peak clearance of microfilariae in the skin at one month after treatment. At six months post treatment, many individuals treated with moxidectin have no detectable microfilariae present in their skin.

Epidemiology

About 21 million people were infected with this parasite in 2017; about 1.2 million of those had vision loss. As of 2017, about 99% of onchocerciasis cases occurred in Africa. Onchocerciasis is currently relatively common in 31 African countries, Yemen, and isolated regions of South America. Over 85 million people live in endemic areas, and half of these reside in Nigeria. Another 120 million people are at risk for contracting the disease.  The Onchocerca volvulus main habitat is fast flowing rivers, Onchocerciasis is more commonly found along the large rivers in northern and central regions of the Africa. With a decrease in cases as you move farther away from those rivers. Multiple exposure to simulium blackflies raise the number of adult worms and microfilariae that are present in the host. Risk of contracting Onchocerciasis for causal travelers is low, since it often takes several exposures, while travelers that stay for longer visits such as missionaries or long-term volunteers have a greater risk of contracting Onchocerciasis. Onchocerciasis was eliminated in the northern focus in Chiapas, Mexico, and the focus in Oaxaca, Mexico, where Onchocerca volvulus existed, was determined, after several years of treatment with ivermectin, as free of the transmission of the parasite. In April 2013, Colombia became the first country to achieve elimination of Onchocerciasis, verified by the World Health Organization. In the following three years, Ecuador and Guatemala, along with Mexico have been verified to have eliminated Onchocerciasis, with the use of ivermectin.

According to a 2002 WHO report, onchocerciasis has not caused a single death, but its global burden is 987,000 disability adjusted life years (DALYs).  The severe pruritus alone accounts for 60% of the DALYs. Infection reduces the host's immunity and resistance to other diseases, which results in an estimated reduction in life expectancy of 13 years. In 2017, the Global Burden of Disease study said that an estimated 220 million people needed preventive chemotherapy for onchocerciasis. Of those infected, 14.6 million had skin disease and 1.15 million were experiencing vision loss.

Onchocerciasis is the second leading cause of blindness from infectious causes. Main disease symptoms, such as blindness and itching, contribute to disease burden by limiting the infected individuals ability to live and work. Individuals most at risk are those who live or work in areas where simulium blackflies are most common, mostly near rivers and streams. Rural agricultural areas in sub-Saharan Africa see the most disease burden by blackfly bites. Onchocerciasis common to tropical environments, like that of sub-Saharan Africa, where more than 99% percent of infected individuals occupy the 31 countries. Onchocerciasis can be linked to impoverished remote areas, as residents who experience symptoms can no longer tend to land or navigate the area.  Areas with high infection rates may experience up to one-third of residents affected by onchocerciasis symptoms. The age group most impacted by the disease are individuals age 61+ years.

History
Onchocerca originated in Africa and was exported to the Americas by the slave trade, as part of the Columbian exchange that introduced other old world diseases such as yellow fever into the New World. Findings of a phylogenetic study in the mid-90s are consistent with an introduction to the New World in this manner. DNA sequences of savannah and rainforest strains in Africa differ, while American strains are identical to savannah strains in western Africa. The microfilarial parasite that causes the disease was first identified in 1874 by an Irish naval surgeon, John O'Neill, who was seeking to identify the cause of a common skin disease along the west coast of Africa, known as "craw-craw".  Rudolf Leuckart, a German zoologist, later examined specimens of the same filarial worm sent from Africa by a German missionary doctor in 1890 and named the organism Filaria volvulus.

Rodolfo Robles and Rafael Pacheco in Guatemala first mentioned the ocular form of the disease in the Americas about 1915. They described a tropical worm infection with adult Onchocerca that included inflammation of the skin, especially the face ('erisipela de la costa'), and eyes. The disease, commonly called the "filarial blinding disease", and later referred to as "Robles disease", was common among coffee plantation workers. Manifestations included subcutaneous nodules, anterior eye lesions, and dermatitis. Robles sent specimens to Émile Brumpt, a French parasitologist, who named it O. caecutiens in 1919, indicating the parasite caused blindness (Latin "caecus" meaning blind). The disease was also reported as being common in Mexico.   By the early 1920s, it was generally agreed that the filaria in Africa and Central America were morphologically indistinguishable and the same as that described by O'Neill 50 years earlier.

Robles hypothesized that the vector of the disease was the day-biting black fly, Simulium. Scottish physician Donald Blacklock of the Liverpool School of Tropical Medicine confirmed this mode of transmission in studies in Sierra Leone. Blacklock's experiments included the re-infection of Simulium flies exposed to portions of the skin of infected subjects on which nodules were present, which led to elucidation of the life cycle of the Onchocerca parasite.  Blacklock and others could find no evidence of eye disease in Africa. Jean Hissette, a Belgian ophthalmologist,  discovered in 1930 that the organism was the cause of a "river blindness" in the Belgian Congo. Some of the patients reported seeing tangled threads or worms in their vision, which were microfilariae moving freely in the aqueous humor of the anterior chamber of the eye. Blacklock and Strong had thought the African worm did not affect the eyes, but Hissette reported that 50% of patients with onchocerciasis near the Sankuru river in the Belgian Congo had eye disease and 20% were blind. Hisette Isolated the microfilariae from an enucleated eye and described the typical chorioretinal scarring, later called the "Hissette-Ridley fundus" after another ophthalmologist, Harold Ridley, who also made extensive observations on onchocerciasis patients in north west Ghana, publishing his findings in  1945.  Ridley first postulated that the disease was brought by the slave trade. The international scientific community was initially skeptical of Hisette's findings, but they were confirmed by the Harvard African Expedition of 1934, led by Richard P. Strong, an American physician of tropical medicine.

Society and culture
Since 1987, ivermectin has been provided free of charge for use in humans by Merck through the Mectizan donation program (MDP). The MDP works together with ministries of health and nongovernmental development organisations, such as the World Health Organization, to provide free ivermectin to those who need it in endemic areas. Due to the joint efforts of NGOs and WHO, onchocerciasis is no longer an obstacle in socio-economic development.

In 2015 William C. Campbell and Satoshi Ōmura were co-awarded half of that year's Nobel Prize in Physiology or Medicine for the discovery of the avermectin family of compounds, the forerunner of ivermectin. The latter has come to decrease the occurrence of lymphatic filariasis and onchocerciasis.

Uganda's government, working with the Carter Center river blindness program since 1996, switched strategies for distribution of Mectizan. The male-dominated volunteer distribution system had failed to take advantage of traditional kinship structures and roles. The program switched in 2014 from village health teams to community distributors, primarily selecting women with the goal of assuring that everyone in the circle of their family and friends received river blindness information and Mectizan.

In 2021, Nigeria had the greatest prevalence of onchocerciasis infections globally, and attributed the infection to 30.2% of blindness cases in the country. A study from  western Nigeria found that residents believed that the parasitic effects of the disease was necessary to stimulate fertility, and that the disease was thought to be carried by all residents.

Research 
Animal models for the disease are somewhat limited, as the parasite only lives in primates, but there are close parallels. Litomosoides sigmodontis , which will naturally infect cotton rats, has been found to fully develop in BALB/c mice. Onchocerca ochengi, the closest relative of O. volvulus, lives in intradermal cavities in cattle, and is also spread by black flies. Both systems are useful, but not exact, animal models.

A study of 2501 people in Ghana showed the prevalence rate doubled between 2000 and 2005 despite treatment, suggesting the parasite is developing resistance to the drug. A clinical trial of another anti-parasitic agent, moxidectin (manufactured by Wyeth), began on July 1, 2009 (NCT00790998).

A Cochrane review compared outcomes of people treated with ivermectin alone versus doxycycline plus ivermectin. While there were no differences in most vision-related outcomes between the two treatments, there was low quality evidence suggesting treatment with doxycycline plus ivermectin showed improvement in iridocyclitis and punctate keratitis, over those treated with ivermectin alone.

In 2017 the WHO set up the Onchocerciasis Technical Advisory Subgroup (OTS) to further research and establish areas that require drug administration. The OTS also identifies co-endemic areas with lymphatic filariasis to properly treat Onchocerciasis and lymphatic filariasis.

The WHO priorities research to achieve elimination of onchocerciasis. Research approaches include: improving outreach efforts to marginalized populations, expanding mapping of endemic areas of onchocerciasis, improve and standardize information on mass drug administration, develop diagnostic approaches, surveillance strategies, and therapeutic approaches.<ref>

See also

 Carter Center River Blindness Program
 List of parasites (human)
 Neglected tropical diseases
 Rodolfo Robles
 United Front Against Riverblindness
 Harold Ridley (ophthalmologist)

References

External links

 CDC Parasites of public health concern

Spirurida
Tropical diseases
Helminthiases
Infectious diseases with eradication efforts
Parasitic infestations, stings, and bites of the skin
Wikipedia medicine articles ready to translate
Wikipedia infectious disease articles ready to translate